Hammond School, originally James H. Hammond Academy, is a pre-K through 12 college preparatory day school in Columbia, South Carolina, founded in 1966. The school is an accredited school with the South Carolina Independent School Association (SAIS) and the National Association of Independent Schools (NAIS). The choir is known for its performance for Pope Francis at the 2017 New Years Day Mass at St. Peter's Basilica. The school, which was founded as a segregation academy, is known for its athletic and academic accomplishments. The school's namesake, James Henry Hammond, – a brutal slaveholder known for raping his brother's four daughters as well as his sexual exploitation of enslaved women – has been a source of enduring controversy. The current Hammond School head is Andy North.

History

The school was founded in 1966 as a segregation academy in response to the court ordered racial integration of public schools. It is named for James Henry Hammond, who was a particularly brutal and outspoken proponent of slavery. Like other segregation academies, the Hammond's name was chosen to buttress the lost cause myth in support of historical revisionism. Tom Turnipseed commented Hammond's "name was chosen because his grandson contributed significant money to the school's founding, and Confederate big-wigs were favored as names for white-flight private schools started as part of the backlash to impending racial desegregation of public schools."

The school's enrollment surged in 1968 when details of the public school desegregation busing plan were released. One parent told that Los Angeles Times that she enrolled her children at Hammond Academy because "integration had turned the public schools upside down"

In 1972, Hammond Academy's tax exemption was revoked by the IRS when it refused to document that it had a racially nondiscriminatory admissions policy. In 1976, a school administrator told John Egerton the school did not want the tax exemption because the school was "better off without negroes". The administrator further opined that "segregation is coming back to this country" because it is a "more natural condition."

The school initially eschewed extracurricular activities in order to emphasize education in "basic subjects".

The school quickly grew to 1,200 students, but in the 1980s enrollment dwindled so low that policy changes were required. In the 1980s, under headmaster Nick Hagerman, Hammond Academy moved away from its segregationist roots. The school stopped flying the Confederate flag in 1984 and began recruiting minority students with scholarships. By 1988, the Hammond School had regained its tax-exempt status. By the 1990s, the resulting admission of more than just a token amount of minority students moved Hammond into what Jason Kreutner described as class-based segregation.

In 1989, the board of trustees voted to change the school's name to Hammond School. The school says the name change was "to adopt a global purpose". According to Tom Turnipseed, the name was changed in order to "moderate the shameful sensuality and radical racism of its namesake."

In 2020, although several alumni asked the school to discontinue the use of Hammond's name because of his history of incest, pedophilia and sexual abuse, the board of trustees retained the name. NBA player Alex English, who sent his children to Hammond, said they experienced racism at the school, including from other parents who ostracized white students for dating black classmates. English transferred some of his children out of Hammond.

Demographics
For the 20182019 school year, the Hammond School's student body was 76.9% white and 23.1% minority races. The student/teacher ratio is 8:1. The grades are relatively evenly split with 31% of the student body in high school, 31% in middle school, and 38% in elementary school.

Accreditation

Hammond School is an accredited school with the South Carolina Independent School Association (SCISA) and the National Association of Independent Schools (NAIS).

Athletics
In 2018, the school won the SCISA class 3A football championship. , the Hammond School has won 16 football championships, including 6 consecutive championships from 2006 to 2012.

The Skyhawks won the boys' basketball SCISA class 3A championship in 2015.

The Skyhawks won the girls' basketball SCISA class 3A championship in 2018, the 11th title but the first since 1993, the last of four consecutive championships.

The Skyhawks won the boys' baseball SCISA class 3A championship in 2021, the 6th title for the school. It was the second title under Coach Braciszewski, who joined the Skyhawks staff in 2016 and was named head coach in 2018.

Campus
The Hammond School is located in the Woodland Estates neighborhood in eastern Columbia, SC. The campus is 110 acres, including a  farm. The farm has hosted equestrian competitions.

In 2017, the city of Columbia approved a plan to add  of buildings to the campus, including an enlarged gym and new classroom building.

Notable alumni
Kelsey Chow – actor
Jody Lumpkin – basketball player and coach
Jeff Scott – American football coach, former head coach at University of South Florida
Seventh Woods – basketball player
 Charlie Todd – comedian

References

External links
Hammond School Website

Preparatory schools in South Carolina
Private high schools in South Carolina
Schools in Columbia, South Carolina
Educational institutions established in 1966
Segregation academies in South Carolina
1966 establishments in South Carolina